Damien Lock (born 1 October 1978) is a former Australian rules footballer & current Professional Boxer, who played with Carlton in the Australian Football League (AFL).

Notes

External links

Damien Lock's profile at Bluseum

1978 births
Carlton Football Club players
Eaglehawk Football Club players
Bendigo Pioneers players
Bendigo Football Club players
Australian rules footballers from Victoria (Australia)
Living people